María Elena Marqués Rangel (14 December 1926 – 11 November 2008) was a Mexican actress and singer who was a star during the Golden Age of Mexican cinema in the 1940s and 1950s.

Biography
She was born on December 14, 1926 in Mexico City. She was discovered by the film director Fernando de Fuentes, who was her neighbor.

Her first film was Dos corazones y un tango (1942) where she performed with the Argentine tango singer Andrés Falgás.
In 1943 she worked in Doña Bárbara with María Félix, Romeo y Julieta, with Cantinflas, and Así se quiere en Jalisco, with Jorge Negrete. She worked again with Negrete in Me he de comer esa tuna (1945) and Tal para cual (1951).
In her best-known role, Marqués starred in the 1947 film La perla (The Pearl); she played the wife of a fisherman who finds the ill-fated pearl. The film was based on John Steinbeck's book The Pearl. The film was directed by Emilio Fernández and her co-star was Pedro Armendáriz.
Marqués was directed again by Fernández in Cuando levanta la niebla (1952), Reportaje (1953) and Pueblito (1961). She worked in Hollywood in Across the Wide Missouri (1951) opposite Clark Gable, and in Ambush at Tomahawk Gap (1953), with John Hodiak.

As a singer, she recorded songs such as "Cartas marcadas", "Échame a mí la culpa", "El aguacero", "Grítenme piedras del campo", "La cigarra", "La noche de mi mal", "La Panchita", "Tres consejos" and "Tú, sólo tú", with the Mariachi Santana and the Trío Tamaulipeco.

Marqués worked on 15 radio soap operas and 30 other radio programs for XEW, acted in 20 TV theater productions and 10 telenovelas.
Her last work as an actress was in the film El testamento (1981).

Marqués was married to the actor Miguel Torruco.

Marqués died of heart failure in Mexico City on November 11, 2008 with her children Marisela and Miguel Torruco Marqués at her side.

Filmography (selected)

 Dos corazones y un tango (1942)
 La razón de la culpa (1942)
 Así se quiere en Jalisco (1943)
 Doña Bárbara (1943)
 Romeo y Julieta (1943)
 The Two Orphans (1944)
 Me he de comer esa tuna (1945)
 Rosa del Caribe (1945)
 La perla (1947)
 La negra Angustias (1950)
 Gemma (1950)
 Yo Quiero Ser Mala (1950)
 Across the Wide Missouri (1951)
 Cuando levanta la niebla (1952)
 Made for Each Other (1953)
 Ambush at Tomahawk Gap (1953)
 Reportaje (1953) 
 Historia de un abrigo de mink (1955)
 Así era Pancho Villa (1956)
 A Media Luz los Tres (1958)
 Pueblito (1961)
 ¿Que haremos con papá? (1968)
 El Jardín de los Cerezos (1978)
 El Testamento (1981)

Television
 Amor y orgullo (1967)

References

Bibliography

External links

María Elena Marqués at Cine Mexicano

1926 births
2008 deaths
Golden Age of Mexican cinema
Mexican film actresses
Mexican stage actresses
Mexican television actresses
Ranchera singers
Actresses from Mexico City
20th-century Mexican women singers